Parotocinclus collinsae is a species of catfish in the family Loricariidae. It is native to South America, where it occurs in the Essequibo River basin. The species reaches 5 cm (2 inches) SL.

References 

Loricariidae
Fish described in 1985